Lost Souls is a 1992 horror novel  by American writer Poppy Z. Brite, his debut novel.  It is the only novel-length adventure of Brite's 'Steve and Ghost' characters, popularized in numerous short stories.  The novel is an extended version of the short story "The Seed of Lost Souls".

Several characters introduced in the novel make appearances in Brite's second novel, Drawing Blood, though it is not a direct sequel.

Characters

Steve Finn 
Steve was raised in Missing Mile, North Carolina. He works in a record shop in his home town called the Whirling Disc. He is described as tall and wiry, with a hawkish nose, and long black hair he rarely washes. Steve is proud and stubborn, drinks to excess, and is prone to violent outbursts. He is haunted throughout the novel by the memory of his relationship with his ex-girlfriend Ann, which he terminated abruptly by raping her on discovery of her infidelity.

Ghost 
Ghost is Steve's best friend and though their relationship throughout the novel often has homoerotic undertones, they do not become lovers until the follow-up story, "Stay Awake".  Ghost is described as appearing much like to his namesake, very translucent skin, white blond, wispy hair and huge blue eyes. Kind and compassionate, Ghost often has unexplainable visions, and sometimes they are a foreshadowing of things to come.

Ann Bransby-Smith 
Ann, Steve's ex-girlfriend, plays an ambiguous role throughout much of the novel, but she becomes helplessly intertwined in the plot once Zillah, Twig, Molochai and Nothing roll into Missing Mile, North Carolina.  She has long, red-gold hair and spends most of her time early in the novel fretting about her increasing dislike for her new boyfriend, and her longing for Steve. She is one of the most tragic victims of the story.
She is a painter, a tough yet vulnerable character whose strained relations with her father and bitter love for Steve lead her in to a series of defiant acts that ultimately undo her.

Lost Souls? 
Steve and Ghost's band. Ghost is the vocalist, and Steve plays guitar.  Lost Souls? has toured across the United States, and they frequently perform at the local club in Missing Mile, North Carolina, a place called The Sacred Yew.

Other appearances 
"Angels" (printed in Wormwood)
"The Seed of Lost Souls" (short story of which Lost Souls is an expansion)
"The South Central Rain Story"
"Stay Awake"
"America" (printed in "Are You Loathsome Tonight?)
"How to Get Ahead in New York" ('Wormwood'')
"Con Party at Hotel California" (original first chapter for the unfinished novel that would be the sequel to Lost Souls)

Vampires

The vampires of this novel are quite dissimilar to those of traditional lore.  Rather than being transformed humans, they are a separate species who are born vampires. While most feed on blood, some find alternative sustenance (e.g., love and beauty). There are also distinct differences between older and younger vampires. Older vampires have naturally sharp teeth, are sensitive to sunlight, and cannot eat or drink. Younger vampires have normal human teeth that must be filed, are insensitive to sunlight, and can both eat and drink (as demonstrated by Zillah's group's liking for chartreuse). Brite's vampires also seem to lack many supernatural powers beyond quick healing, heightened sense, and abnormal strength. They can be killed if the heart or brain is destroyed. Female vampires can also be killed by childbirth because vampiric infants kill their mothers in the womb.

Nothing (Formerly Jason, née Nothing)
A teenage vampire taken in by humans as a baby. Born in New Orleans, he was taken (by Christian) to a small town in Maryland after he was born and left on the doorstep of an unsuspecting couple. The story is centered around him and his journey to find his real family. Nothing's name means that he is a blank slate, and can write anything down on it he wants to, making himself whatever he wants, as noted in the novel. This is a main part of the larger Existential/Nihilist themes running through the novel.

Zillah
Zillah is Nothing's father as well as his lover. His distinguishing features include his crazy green eyes and the purple, green, and gold-dyed streaks in his hair - the colors of Mardi Gras. He is described as being incredibly beautiful - androgynous, slender, and shorter than Molochai and Twig, with pierced nipples and sharp, black-lacquered nails. He is portrayed throughout the novel as cruel, insensitive, and violent (sexually and otherwise), but he displays fondness for Nothing.

Twig and Molochai

Zillah's gluttonous companions and twin brothers, both very much alike. They are rarely found apart from one another. Twig is the taller of the two, he has sharp features and wicked demeanor. Twig also drives the trio's van around the country. Molochai is slightly shorter, with roundish, babyish features. He favors sweets and cakes to the other's more adult tastes.
There is no explanation of how the two found each other yet there is an account of their first encounter with Zillah whereupon they misjudge his true nature and attack him. They are easily overpowered by the older and more experienced vampire and thereafter act under his supervision.

Christian

Bartender in New Orleans who looks after Nothing's mother, Jessy, through the duration of her pregnancy, and the one responsible for taking him away from the city after his birth. Christian finds himself almost on the side of the humans, and sometimes the lone voice of wisdom in the vampires' "family." He is the oldest vampire in the novel, being 383 years old. He is also the most isolated character in the novel, perhaps because of his age. Christian has real fangs rather than sharpened teeth and is the only vampire in the novel that cannot consume human food and drink, he must survive solely on blood. He is also the only one intolerant to sunlight, though he can move about in the day if he keeps his skin and eyes completely covered.

Arkady Raventon 

Arkady is the sinister and skeletal proprietor of a magic shop in New Orleans. He is in mourning for his brother Ashley, himself a victim of two less conventional vampires and purports to have the knowledge and ability to cheat the vampires out of their natural intentions.

Jessy 

A fifteen-year-old girl devoted to the vampiric myth, Jessy stumbles in to the vampires' world not exactly in the manner that she originally would have hoped. She finds employ and board at Christian's Bar due to Christian's sense of responsibility over her predicament.

External links
 Steve and Ghost

Notes 

1992 American novels
1992 fantasy novels
Novels with bisexual themes
Novels by Poppy Z. Brite
Debut fantasy novels
Novels set in North Carolina
American vampire novels
LGBT-related horror literature
1992 debut novels
Bisexuality-related fiction
Delacorte Press books